KHRW (92.7 FM, "Grace FM") is a radio station licensed to Ranchester, Wyoming, United States. It serves the Sheridan area, and carries a Contemporary Christian format. The station is currently owned by Legend Communications of Wyoming, LLC.

History

The station began as KHRW on September 1, 2006. At that time, the station carried a religious format and was owned by Horizon Christian Fellowship. It served the Ranchester area. In 2009, the station was sold to Global News Consultants, LLC. Legend Communications of Wyoming, LLC, operated the station following the sale. The station returned to air in April 2011 with a classic hits format provided by Dial Global Networks. Following the dissolving of the satellite format in 2012, the station chose to operate via local programming instead. The format mirrored sister station KDDV, 101.5 licensed to Wright, Wyoming. Both are owned by the same company, Legend Communications, LLC.

The station's tower is located southwest of Sheridan, near Red Grade Road. It shares the tower with KSGW-TV. Its studio is located at 324 Coffeen Avenue in Sheridan.
The station added a weekly hour-long Spanish show in December 2014, hosted by a local high school teacher.

On November 19, 2014, it was announced that the station would be acquired by Legend Communications, sold from former owner Global News Consultants for $262,000, along with sister station KYTS 105.7 FM from Manderson, Wyoming. The purchase was consummated on February 9, 2015.
In 2019, the station flipped formats to rock oriented music, and became known as "92.7 X Rock".

The station was an affiliate of the syndicated Pink Floyd program "Floydian Slip."
In late June 2022, the station flipped formats from rock to Christian Contemporary, and rebranded to "Grace FM". The station competes locally with 89.9 K-Love (K210AM), and Pilgrim Radio on 99.3 (K257EO). The format flip brings the station back to its roots when owned by Horizon Christian Fellowship.

References

External links

Radio stations established in 2006
Radio stations established in 2011
HRW
2006 establishments in Wyoming
2011 establishments in Wyoming
Sheridan County, Wyoming